Sophia Petrillo is a character from the sitcom television series The Golden Girls and its spin-offs The Golden Palace and Empty Nest. She also appeared in episodes of the series Blossom and Nurses. Her character was played by the actress Estelle Getty for 10 years and 258 episodes.

Chronology

Early history 
Sophia was born in Sicily to Angelo, Sr. and Eleanor. Their family name was never established in the series. She had two sisters, Angela and Regina, and a brother, Angelo, Jr. Although another brother was mentioned, he was unnamed and was only spoken of a few times. Dorothy mentions an "Uncle Vito" in Season 2, but it is unclear whether he is Sophia's brother or the brother of her husband, Salvadore. In the first episode of The Golden Palace (1992) Sophia was described as a 87-year-old who experiences flashbacks to her younger life in Sicily, depicting herself as a young peasant girl having multiple romantic affairs earlier in life (1912 and 1922). However, in another Season 2 episode "And Then There Was One", Sophia claims she had been "walking since 1904." These discrepancies are likely due to age-related cognition errors, or more likely, dramatic license taken by the show's producers. 

As a teenager, while living in a village in Sicily, Sophia was briefly engaged to a young man, Augustine Bagatelli. She also claims that she was once engaged to her brother - something largely dismissed as a joke in the episode. Later, she became engaged to Giuseppe Mangiacavallo, who jilted her at the altar. Sophia's first marriage to Guido Spirelli (she was 14 and it was an arranged marriage) ended in annulment, after which, she moved to New York, which left her with no accent to show she had grown up speaking the Sicilian language. Instead, she sports a Brooklyn accent with a fast speaking pace, which often contributed to the humor in her one-liners.

Sophia later married Salvadore "Sal" Petrillo (played in flashbacks by Sid Melton) and had three children with him: Dorothy, now a divorced substitute teacher; Phil (an unseen character), a cross-dresser with a wife named Angela; he was a welder with several children who lived in a trailer park in Newark, New Jersey. He later died of a heart attack during the series. Sophia's other daughter, Gloria (played by Doris Belack and later Dena Dietrich), lived in California and married into money but later lost her husband to an unknown cause. Sophia remained with Salvadore until his death from a heart attack. In a 1985 episode, Sophia mentions that Sal had died 30 years earlier. However, in a 1988 episode, it is stated that Sal died 27 years earlier.

The Golden Girls (1985–92) 
In her later years, Sophia suffered a stroke--the effects of which are said to be a partial explanation for Sophia's blunt, uncensored, and brazen remarks. She was subsequently placed in a retirement home, Shady Pines, by her daughter, Dorothy. However, after Shady Pines was damaged in a fire, Sophia moved in with Dorothy. Sophia didn't have many good things to say about "the home," alluding to poor treatment by the staff many times. Dorothy sometimes threatened to send her back there if she was "behaving badly".

Whilst living in Miami, Sophia had many suitors but did not date any of them for a substantial amount of time. She did, however, remarry once more. Max Weinstock (Jack Gilford) was her late husband's long-time business partner, and someone Sophia had long blamed for ruining the business, although it was later revealed Sal was responsible. Sophia and Max forgave each other after the latter revealed the truth, and the two quickly became close and got married. The newlyweds realized their romance would not work out and they parted ways, as friends. As divorce would have gone against her Roman Catholic beliefs, Sophia and Max never divorced.

Due to Sophia's Sicilian descent, there were regular hints in the series that she and her family had some mafia connections. She made reference to several vendettas, and it was even hinted that Sophia herself had done mob work; she once stated that no one in her family had "ever left a body to be found". Sophia also claimed to have been present at the 1929 St. Valentines Day Massacre, which she then took back, stating, "Oh yeah, I was at the movies that day. All day." It was revealed that she was present at a St. Valentines Day Massacre but not the St. Valentines Day Massacre.

Sophia believed strongly in ancient Sicilian custom and traditions, and in the power of a "Sicilian curse." The list of people she claims to have "cursed" included Shelley Long, the Baltimore Colts, the New York Jets, Giuseppe Mangiacavallo (the boy who stood her up at the altar), and Leonard Barton (the girls' next-door neighbor who expressed a disdain for Italians). She had threatened to cast a curse on Dorothy (before she found out that it was prohibited by another arcane custom), and on Stan Zbornak. In the final season, Sophia spent two episodes doing odd tasks in order to save Dorothy from an ancient curse from a Sicilian strega, or witch.

In the series finale of The Golden Girls, Sophia, after initially deciding to follow the now-married Dorothy out of the house, turned back and decided to stay with Rose and Blanche, which set up the transition to The Golden Palace.

The Golden Palace (1992-93) 
When Rose, Blanche, and Sophia invested in a hotel, Sophia was installed as one of the two chefs, specializing in Italian cuisine while the hotel's previous chef, Chuy Castillos (Cheech Marin), handled Mexican food. Sophia began to show signs of senile dementia, usually in comical situations (for instance, she is shown to be standing still and apparently unconscious while attempting to operate a vacuum cleaner), and her bluntness was toned down to a certain extent. (In reality, Getty would later be diagnosed with Lewy body dementia herself; however, in The Golden Palace, her acting and ability to remember lines had improved compared to on The Golden Girls, during which she had struggled to remember her lines.) In the episode "One Angry Stan" Sophia was the only one to witness Stanley Zbornak after he had faked his death to avoid tax troubles; the fact that no one else saw Stan in these episodes (he ducks out of sight whenever someone else enters the room), coupled with Sophia's increased senility, made it unclear whether or not Stan was really alive, or if Sophia was hallucinating.

Empty Nest (Seasons 6 & 7, 1993-95) 
After the events of The Golden Palace (which ended without a series finale), Sophia returned to the Shady Pines nursing home, joining the cast of the Golden Girls spin-off, Empty Nest for its last two seasons. She had previously made a guest appearance in Season 1 and Season 4.

Relationships and characteristics
Sophia is best known for her wisecracks, put-downs and brazen remarks, often commenting on Dorothy's unmarried state, Blanche's promiscuity, and Rose's cluelessness. However, despite her sharp criticism of her daughter and roommates, she loves and cares for them deeply; she even sees Rose and Blanche as surrogate daughters. The other women usually seek Sophia out for advice, which she is all too willing to share, usually beginning with her catchphrase, "Picture it…"
Like Rose's tall tales, Sophia's parables often end with a moral, from which advice can be gleaned. These stories usually also involved historical figures, with Sophia claiming to have had trysts with Pablo Picasso, Sigmund Freud, and Winston Churchill, among others. She also claims to have befriended many famous people including Golda Meir, Mama Celeste, and accidentally claimed that Robert Frost was always "nipping at my nose" (she confused him with Jack Frost).

Similarly to her daughter, Sophia is liberal in her beliefs and is suspected to be a Democrat. She supported same-sex marriage and told Dorothy that if she had a gay child she would not love them any less. In a Season 7 episode, Sophia complained about how there were no good Democratic candidates running in the Presidential election that year.

Members of Sophia's family who appeared on the program include: Her sister, Angela (Nancy Walker for 2 episodes in Season 2); her brother, Angelo (played by Bill Dana); her father Angelo (also played by Dana), seen in a flashback; her daughter, Gloria; her husband, Sal (in flashbacks and in dream sequences); and Sophia's own mother (played by Bea Arthur), who also appeared exclusively in a flashback; and even Dorothy at a younger age (played by Lynnie Greene).

It is unclear whether Sophia moved to the United States alone or with her family, as her sister and mother had both lived in New York as well. Sophia and her sister Angela were estranged for decades, after a misunderstanding at a Christmas party in 1955; Angela then became a widow and she moved back to Sicily for 30 years, until they reconciled and she moved back to the U.S. Sophia's brother Angelo (initially a priest, then a layman) remained in Sicily and moved to the United States only in Season 6.

A continuity error involves Sophia's mother. In an early episode, Sophia's brother stated that their mother died seventy-two years earlier just as Angelo was about to become a priest (which he did not do). In a later episode, Dorothy, as a young woman, brought Sophia's mother to visit. In an episode not long after this one, Dorothy mentioned that her grandmother (Sophia's mother) died when Dorothy was six years old.

Appearance
In her younger years, Sophia apparently had always been short, with reddish-brown hair (Getty's natural color), but in one episode she says she was "a tall voluptuous blonde with a butt like granite" when she was younger (though this statement was likely a by-product of her penchant for telling tall tales). Getty portrayed the younger Sophia in occasional flashbacks, without her white wig and aging makeup.

During the series' run, Sophia resembled the archetypal "old lady" in looks: White-haired, small stature, wrinkles, and large-framed eyeglasses. She owned a tan bamboo handbag which became her personal trademark, as she carried the purse everywhere, even around the house (including the bathroom). Sophia's sister Angela displayed these traits as well.

While she is the oldest of the four main characters, Getty was younger than both White and Arthur, despite portraying the latter's mother.

Appearances in other media
Outside The Golden Girls, Sophia appears on two episodes of Empty Nest ("Libby's Gift" and "Windy") before becoming a regular for the final two seasons. She also appears on the Blossom episode "I Ain't Got No Buddy" and the Nurses episode "Temporary Setbacks".

In 2018, the gaming app New Yahtzee with Buddies Dice honored Petrillo with a dice master character "Sothreea Petrollo," recreating Petrillo's image in the shape of dice.

References

The Golden Girls characters
Fictional Sicilian people
Fictional immigrants to the United States
Fictional characters from New York City
Television characters introduced in 1985
Fictional hoteliers
American female characters in television